Erin Chan (born August 9, 1979) is a Canadian synchronized swimmer.

Chan began synchronized swimming at age seven. She won a bronze medal at the team event at the 2000 Summer Olympics and at the 2001 world championships in Fukuoka, Japan. Chan also represented Canada in the team event at the 2004 Summer Olympics in Athens, Greece with teammates Courtenay Stewart, Fanny Létourneau, Jessica Chase, Shayna Nackoney, Anouk Reniere-Lafreniere, Marie-Pierre Gagne, Jessika Dubuc and Nicole Cargill.  There, the Canadian squad placed 5th.

Personal life
Chan is an alum of Bishop Carroll High School.

References

External links
 Profile of Erin Chan by at Canoe.ca
 
 
 

1979 births
Canadian sportspeople of Chinese descent
Canadian synchronized swimmers
Living people
Olympic bronze medalists for Canada
Olympic synchronized swimmers of Canada
Swimmers from Toronto
Synchronized swimmers at the 2000 Summer Olympics
Synchronized swimmers at the 2004 Summer Olympics
Olympic medalists in synchronized swimming
Medalists at the 2000 Summer Olympics
World Aquatics Championships medalists in synchronised swimming